Grace Arnold (19 September 1894 – 26 February 1979) was an English actress.

Selected filmography

 Guilt (1931)
 Men Without Honour (1939) - Mrs. Hardy
 Crimes at the Dark House (1940) - Maid (uncredited)
 Spare a Copper (1940) - Music Shop Customer (uncredited)
 Went the Day Well? (1942) - Mrs. Owen
 The Gentle Sex (1943) - Restaurant attendant (uncredited)
 The Bells Go Down (1943) - Canteen Lady (uncredited)
 The Lamp Still Burns (1943) - Sister Grace Annie Sprock (uncredited)
 The Way Ahead (1944) - Mrs. Fletcher
 Give Me the Stars (1945) - Mrs. Gossage
 Johnny Frenchman (1945) - Mrs. Matthews
 Painted Boats (1945) - His Sister
 The Trojan Brothers (1946) - Mrs. Johnson
 They Knew Mr. Knight (1946) - Isabel Blake
 The Captive Heart (1946) - Official (uncredited)
 I'll Turn to You (1946) - Nurse (uncredited)
 Hue and Cry (1947) - Dicky's Mother
 The Loves of Joanna Godden (1947) - Martha
 Jassy (1947) - Housemaid
 Dusty Bates (1947) - Mrs. Ford
 It Always Rains on Sunday (1947) - Ted's Landlady
 My Brother Jonathan (1948) - Woman in Court
 House of Darkness (1948) - Tessa
 Love in Waiting (1948) - Emily Baxter
 The History of Mr. Polly (1949) - Mrs. Rusper (uncredited)
 Passport to Pimlico (1949) - Pompous Woman
 The Man from Yesterday (1949) - Mrs. Amersley
 Old Mother Riley's New Venture (1949) - Prison Governor
 Dark Secret (1949) - Housewife (uncredited)
 Dance Hall (1950) - Mrs. Bennett
 The Magnet (1950) - Mrs. Mercer
 Portrait of Clare (1950) - Lady Astill
 Life in Her Hands (1951) - Children's Sister
 Hunted (1952) - Woman in Courtyard
 Brandy for the Parson (1952) - Landlady
 Love's a Luxury (1952) - Mrs. Harris
 Circumstantial Evidence (1952) - Mrs. Jolly
 Escape Route (1952) - Neighbour (uncredited)
 Those People Next Door (1953) - Lady Diana Stevens
 Eight O'Clock Walk (1954) - Mrs. Higgs
 Souls in Conflict (1954)
 Children Galore (1955) - Mrs. Gedge (uncredited)
 Barbados Quest (1955) - Lady Hawksley
 The Secret Tent (1956) - Miss Pearce
 Child in the House (1956) - Mrs. Groves
 Town on Trial (1957) - Club Committee Woman
 High Flight (1957) - Commandant's Wife
 Violent Playground (1958) - Customer in Grocers Shop (uncredited)
 Innocent Sinners (1958) - Miss Roberts (uncredited)
 Sapphire (1959) - Sapphire's Landlady (uncredited)
 Crash Drive (1959) - Mrs. Dixon
 Make Mine Mink (1960) - Orphanage Matron (uncredited)
 Konga (1961) - Miss Barnesdell
 Attempt to Kill (1961) - Housekeeper
 I Thank a Fool (1962) - 2nd Wardress (uncredited)
 Playback (1962) - Miss Wilson
 The Mind Benders (1963) - Train Passenger (uncredited)
 A Jolly Bad Fellow (1964) - 2nd Lady
 Five Have a Mystery to Solve (1964)
 The Heroes of Telemark (1965) - Passenger on 'Galtesund' (uncredited)
 Sky West and Crooked (1966) - Village Woman
 Diamonds for Breakfast (1968) - Museum Visitor with Red Hat (uncredited)

References

External links

1894 births
1979 deaths
English stage actresses
English film actresses
English television actresses
Actresses from London
20th-century English actresses